Tetrabromomethane, CBr4, also known as carbon tetrabromide, is an organic compound (carbon bromide). Both names are acceptable under IUPAC nomenclature.

Physical properties
Tetrabromomethane has two polymorphs: crystalline II or β below 46.9 °C (320.0 K) and crystalline I or α above 46.9 °C. Monoclinic polymorph has space group C2/c with lattice constants: a = 20.9, b = 12.1, c = 21.2 (.10−1 nm), β = 110.5°. Bond energy of C-Br is 235 kJ.mol−1.

Due to its symmetrically substituted tetrahedral structure, its dipole moment is 0 Debye. Critical temperature is 439 °C (712 K) and critical pressure is 4.26 MPa.

Plastic crystallinity
The high temperature α phase is known as a plastic crystal phase. Roughly speaking, the CBr4 are situated on the corners of the cubic unit cell as well as on the centers of its faces in an fcc arrangement. It was thought in the past that the molecules could rotate more or less freely (a 'rotor phase'), so that on a time average they would look like spheres. Recent work  has shown, however, that the molecules are restricted to only 6 possible orientations (Frenkel disorder). Moreover, they cannot take these orientations entirely independently from each other because in some cases the bromine atoms of neighboring molecules would point at each other leading to impossibly short distances. This rules out certain orientational combinations when two neighbor molecules are considered.  Even for the remaining combinations displacive changes occur that better accommodate neighbor to neighbor distances. The combination of censored Frenkel disorder and displacive disorder implies a considerable amount of disorder inside the crystal which leads to highly structured sheets of diffuse scattered intensity in X-ray diffraction. In fact, it is the structure in the diffuse intensity that provides the information about the details of the structure.

Chemical reactions
In combination with triphenylphosphine, CBr4 is used in the Appel reaction, which converts alcohols to alkyl bromides.  Similarly, CBr4 is used in combination with triphenylphosphine in the first step of the Corey-Fuchs reaction, which converts aldehydes into terminal alkynes.  It is significantly less stable than lighter tetrahalomethanes. It is made via bromination of methane using HBr or Br2. It can be also prepared by more economical reaction of tetrachloromethane with aluminium bromide at 100 °C.

Uses
It is used as a solvent for greases, waxes, and oils, in plastic and rubber industry for blowing and vulcanization, further for polymerization, as a sedative and as an intermediate in manufacturing agrochemicals. Due to its non-flammability it is used as an ingredient in fire-resistant chemicals. It is also used for separating minerals because of its high density.

References

External links

MSDS at SIRI.org

Nonmetal halides
Halomethanes
Bromoalkanes
Halogenated solvents